Hypoglaunines are chemical compounds isolated from the bark of Tripterygium hypoglaucum.

Hypoglaunine B is a sesquiterpene alkaloid that is a macrolide incorporating a substituted pyridine and dihydroagarofuran moieties. It exhibits anti-HIV activity in vitro.

References 

sesquiterpene alkaloids